Amy Tennant (born 28 August 1994) is an English field hockey player who plays as a goalkeeper for Reading and the  England and Great Britain national teams.

Club career

She plays club hockey in the Investec Women's Hockey League Conference West for Reading.

Tennant has also played for East Grinstead, German club Großflottbeker THGC in Hamburg Germany and Bowdon Hightown.

References

External links
Profile on England Hockey
Profile on Great Britain Hockey
Profile on Team England

1994 births
Living people
English female field hockey players
Female field hockey goalkeepers
Commonwealth Games medallists in field hockey
Commonwealth Games bronze medallists for England
People from Davyhulme
East Grinstead Hockey Club players
Reading Hockey Club players
Women's England Hockey League players
Field hockey players at the 2018 Commonwealth Games
Medallists at the 2018 Commonwealth Games